Hieracium carneum, common name Huachuca hawkweed, is a North American plant species in the family Asteraceae, native to Arizona, New Mexico, Texas and Chihuahua.

Flower heads contain white to pinkish ray flowers but no disc flowers.

References

External links
Photo of herbarium specimen at Missouri Botanical Garden, collected in New Mexico in 1899, isotype of Hieracium carneum

carneum
Flora of Arizona
Flora of Texas
Flora of Chihuahua (state)
Flora of New Mexico
Plants described in 1881